Barrette or Barrette, also known as a hair clip, hair-slide or clasp (in British English), is a clasp for holding hair in place.

Barette (sport), or Barrette or Barrette Aquitaine, a form of football originating in the southwest of France
Hugo Barrette (born 1991), Canadian cyclist
Simon Jolin-Barrette, Canadian lawyer and politician from Quebec
John Davenport Barrette or Barette (1862–1934), American Brigadier general during World War I
Emery G. Barrette (1930-1993), American clergyman and politician
"Barrette" (song), a 2013 song by the Japanese female group Nogizaka46

See also
Barrett (disambiguation)
Barretter (disambiguation)
Baretta (disambiguation)

Disambiguation pages with surname-holder lists